South Dakota Highway 105 (SD 105) was a state highway located entirely in Union County, in the eastern part of the U.S. state of South Dakota. It traveled from Military Road in North Sioux City to Interstate 29 (I-29) in Jefferson. It was an alternate route to I-29.

Major intersections

References

External links

105
Transportation in Union County, South Dakota